The Jacob Meindert was originally an icebreaking tug named Oldeoog.

It was purchased at auction by Willem Sligting who, when he first saw it, realised it could make a fast sailing vessel.

It was relaunched in 1989 as a two masted topsail schooner.

29-09-2012 It lost both masts in strong breeze, 6 at the Beaufort scale, north of Terschelling. No casualties and was towed to the safety of the harbour in Harlingen.

External links
 Jacob Meindert Website
 Ships History
 Design office 
 Collection of pictures of Oldeoog

References 

Sailing ships of the Netherlands